The Car Chasers is a television series on CNBC that broadcast from March 2013 through February 2015. The reality show covered car restoration professionals who repaired old cars and sold them at a profit. This program also aired in South America on the History Channel as Automaniacos.

Episodes

SEASON 1

1.  Flippin Ferraris
Jeff and Perry get a solid lead on an iconic 1981 Ferrari in Las Vegas with huge potential to make a lot of profit.
03-05-2013

2.  Stacks of Cash and a Hidden Stash
Jeff and Perry find a hidden compound of cars in Midland Odessa, Texas with a treasure trove of priceless cars including a 1969 Dickie Harrell Camaro 427.
03-12-2013

3.  Fast and Furious Profits
Jeff and Meg head to Hollywood in search of movie cars to auction fast; Jeff and his dad make a wager.
03-19-2013

4.  Lights, Cameras, Cars
A major buyer seeks American muscle cars; Jeff and Meg set out to buy cars in Hollywood; a purchase is trashed during transport.
03-26-2013

5.  Hot Rods and Hot Models
Jeff, Meg and Perry head to Vegas for SEMA; a pristine '65 Malibu with a six figure asking price; a 51 Ford Shoebox; a 53 Mercury; Jeff gets worked up over an amazing '71 Chevy.
04-02-2013

6.  American Muscle Madness
Jeff and Perry explore a treasure-laden man cave hidden in an airport hangar; a '65 Shelby Cobra; an authentic World War II era military jeep sporting a 50 caliber machine gun.
04-09-2013

7.  Auction Fever
Perry and Eric trick out a classic '31 hot rod; Meg and Jeff devise a plan to give a big boost to the value of their '53 Merc.
04-16-2013

8.  California Dreamin'
Jeff and Meg consider setting up shop in Southern California; a Porsche Speedster; a mint Ferrari 360 Spyder; a gorgeous Lamborghini Countach.
04-23-2013

SEASON 2

1.  A Tale of Two Chevys
Flat 12 Gallery has a brand new location; Jeff buys a run-of-the- mill '57 Chevy Bel Air and announces his plan to transform it.
10-22-2013

2.  Bayou Blitz
Jeff and Perry chase down some exciting leads on a road trip to Louisiana; Jeff and Perry have to pull out all the stops to bring home some cars.
10-22-2013

3.  Right Around the Corner
Jeff and Matt explore a secret stash packed with an eclectic mix of old cars; Meg and Eric exercise their selling chops back at the shop.
10-29-2013

4. Lights, Camera, Cars!
Meg and Jeff head out to California to search for some unique cars; an American classic that has starred alongside Ryan Gosling.
10-29-2013

5.  In Overdrive to Auction
Jeff and his team scramble to get ready for an upcoming auction in New Orleans.
11-05-2013

6. Let the Good Times Roll
A torrential downpour threatens the team's freshly detailed cars in New Orleans.
11-05-2013

7. More Power
Jeff and Perry wheel and deal in Hollywood; some colorful California locals try to sell Jeff an Italian supercar in appalling condition.
11-12-2013

8. Corvette Crazy
An opportunity to purchase an '82 Corvette arises; Jeff's wily father has some surprises for him at the Lubbock auction.
11-12-2013

9.  The Ride of Frankenstein
Jeff and Meg take a trip to Los Angeles; Jeff must haggles with an eccentric car builder; a Cadillac that belonged to Don Draper.
11-19-2013

10. Fast Deals, Furious Wheels
Jeff is anxious to make a deal on a Richard Petty race car; one of Jeff's friends surprises him with a low-mileage Delorean.
11-19-2013

11.  Bucks Capacitor
Jeff and Perry have leads on vehicles used in the "Fast & Furious" movies; Jeff and Perry try to acquire a dune buggy.
11-26-2013

12. Texas Capital Gains
Matt takes Jeff try to get their hands on a 1965 Mustang; a local motorcycle legend's workshop; Jeff tries to sell a stunt car from the movies.
11-26-2013

13.  Camaro Cache
Jeff and Matt check out a 1970 Camaro that belongs to a man who must sell his toys to help raise his young family.
12-03-2013

14. Formula For Fortune
A brand new Shelby GT500; a family looking for a new car falls in love with Jeff's unique custom 1957 Chevy.
12-03-2013

15.  Put Your Money Where Your Mouth Is
The gang puts finishing touches on all of their cars that are headed for the Austin auction; Jeff must rely on Matt Evans to come to the rescue.
12-10-2013

16. Austin Auction Action
Jeff and Meg go toe to toe with a military couple for a classic '70s muscle car; a friend brings by a late-model Corvette.
12-10-2013

SEASON 3

1. Bigger, Badder, Better  In the Season 3 premiere, Jeff and Meg hire a mechanic to help Eric; and plan to attend a high-end auction in Auburn, Ind. Meanwhile, Jeff inspects a '62 Impala.  11-5-2015

2. The Rarest Cars You'll Ever See Jeff and Meg go to California to look at a 1931 Chevrolet Victoria and wind up getting more than they bargained for, while back in Texas, Eric and Luke work on a six-wheel military vehicle. Later, Jeff clashes with a salesman over a Ferrari Testarossa. 11-5-2015

3.Three Great Cars A search for a 1984 Mercedes reveals a collector with several classic cars, but none of them will start, which means Eric and Luke have to fix them before Meg finds out. 11-12-2015

4.This Screams Money! Jeff checks out a Cadillac DeVille on a tip from Tom; and pursues a Ferrari GTA that was owned by Shaquille O’Neal. 11-19-2015

5. New Kids on the Auction Block The crew go to Indiana for one of the largest auctions of the year, but Jeff and Meg's enthusiasm is tempered by the unpredictability of the bidding. 11-26-2015

6. Going...Going...Gone! The last day at the auction in Indiana is marred by a 1971 Jaguar that won't start. 11-26-2015

7. Sales Contract Killers Jeff braces for a loss on a 1923 Buick; Eric and Luke work on a 1956 Bel Air. 12-3-2015

8. Jeff's Vice Jeff examines a Ferrari that allegedly vanished from the set of "Miami Vice." Also: Jeff tries to make a deal for a custom motorcycle. 12-10-2015

9. Jeff Gets a Woodie A hotel with a 1960s theme hires Jeff and Meg to buy cars from that era, but Jeff's negotiations with a protégé for a 1957 "Woodie" wagon take a turn for the worse. 12-17-2015

10. Four in the Bag Four 1950s family cars are to be on display at a swanky resort in Florida, but Jeff is racing against the clock to make it happen. 01-14-2015

11. Rejected! Jeff's deals fall through for a 1966 Jaguar Mark X and a 1970s Chevelle, but he can't dwell on his disappointment for too long because there's another auction on the horizon. 1-21-2015

12. Going Flat Out Flat 12 pays for six slots at an auction in Missouri but they only have five cars, and two of them may not be ready. 1-28-2015

13. No Bull here! Jeff and Meg go to Florida to visit Rossion Automotive, a maker of high-performance sports cars that floats the idea of Flat 12 becoming a dealership. Meanwhile, Tom works out a deal that involves a 1955 Bel Air and a statue of a bull. 2-4-2015

14. Little Red Corvette Jeff covets a 1969 Corvette that he envisions turning into a classic racer with fender flares from the seller. Later, a pair of iconic British convertibles catch Jeff's eye when he and Meg visit a huge car collection. 2-11-2015

15. Go Big or Go Home  Jeff pursues a Ferrari Mondial and a Camaro Z/28, but learns the latter isn't the original color, which could affect his offer. Later, Jeff informs Meg he wants to stage an auto show and auction in Texas, but she balks at the price. 2-18-2015

16. Carmageddon In the Season 3 finale, an event called Carmageddon in Lubbock, Texas, features a classic car show, an auto-cross race and an auction, but the latter gets off to a slow start, forcing Jeff to take a risk by selling a customized military vehicle. 2-25-2015

Reception

Allison Keene of The Hollywood Reporter said the show accurately reflects the purpose and focus of CNBC.

Jim Motavalli of the New York Times said “The Car Chasers,” an auto-themed reality show on CNBC, comes back for a second season of wheeling and dealing on Tuesday. Jeff Allen, the owner of Flat 12 Gallery in Lubbock, Tex., roams the countryside looking for bargains that he and his team — including his bottom-line-oriented wife, Meg Bailey; his fixer, Perry Barndt; and a master mechanic, Eric Ables — can flip for a profit.

Jeff Allen

KS Wang of Motortrend said Jeff Allen lives a life any car enthusiast would envy. He gets to drive any car he has on his lot, and he buys and sells cars for Hollywood stars like Tim Allen, Charlie Sheen, and director Brett Ratner. He also provides cars for movies. And now, CNBC wants to chronicle his life to show how he flips interesting cars for a profit. The cable network's is heading into the world of unscripted television, and Allen's show "The Car Chasers" is one of the first two reality shows CNBC unveiled last week in its primetime block.

References

External links
 The Car Chasers (CNBC show information)
 Flat 12 Gallery

2013 American television series debuts
2015 American television series endings
2010s American reality television series
Conservation and restoration of vehicles
CNBC original programming